Paweł Nowak (born 27 January 1979 in Kraków) is a Polish midfielder who currently plays for Garbarnia Kraków.

External links 
  Paweł Nowak profile - 90minut.pl

1979 births
Living people
Polish footballers
Association football midfielders
Wisła Kraków players
MKS Cracovia (football) players
Lechia Gdańsk players
Hutnik Nowa Huta players
Sandecja Nowy Sącz players
Ekstraklasa players
Footballers from Kraków